Statistics of Swiss Super League in the 1959–60 season.

Overview
It was contested by 14 teams, and BSC Young Boys won the championship.

League standings

Results

Sources
 Switzerland 1959–60 at RSSSF

Swiss Football League seasons
Swiss
1959–60 in Swiss football